TRENDnet is a global manufacturer of computer networking products headquartered in Torrance, California, in the United States. It sells networking and surveillance products especially in the small to medium business (SMB) and home user market segments.

History

The company was founded in 1990 by Pei Huang and Peggy Huang.

Vulnerabilities 

In September 2013, the Federal Trade Commission (FTC) brought an enforcement action against TRENDnet alleging that the company marketed its SecurView IP cameras describing them as "secure", when in fact the software allowed online viewing by anyone with the camera's IP address.
The FTC approved a final settlement with TRENDnet in February 2014. In January 2018, TRENDnet launched 4K UHD PoE surveillance cameras with covert IR LEDs.

References

External links

Electronics companies established in 1990
Networking companies of the United States
Networking hardware
Routers (computing)
Wireless networking
1990 establishments in California